David Crumb (born May 21, 1962) is an American contemporary composer born into a musical family. His father was composer George Crumb, and his sister was singer Ann Crumb. His music is not as avant-garde or experimental as his father's; it has been called "attractive, accessible, imaginative, well-crafted" by the Chicago-Sun Times, and "expressive and beautiful" by the American Record Guide: reviews listed on the Presser bio.

Life
Crumb received his B.M. from the Eastman School, and his M.A. and Ph.D. from the University of Pennsylvania. His most prominent composition teachers were Samuel Adler, Richard Wernick, Chinary Ung, Stephen Jaffe, Jay Reise, Mark Kopytman, Lukas Foss and Oliver Knussen.

He is professor of composition at the University of Oregon (on faculty since 1997).

Crumb has received numerous awards.

Selected works
Kinetikus for large percussion ensemble (2009)
Hearing Bells for soprano, flute, oboe, cello, percussion and piano (2004–2005)
Improvisations on an English Folk Tune for flute, clarinet, violin, cello and piano (2004)
Suspended Blue for brass quintet (2003)
Primordial Fantasy for piano and chamber ensemble (2002)
September Elegy for violin and piano (2001)
Harmonia Mundi for 2 pianos and 2 percussion (2001)
Variation on "Round Midnight" for solo piano (2001)
Awakening for trumpet and percussion (2001)
The Whisperer for 2 pianos and 2 percussion (1999)
Piano Quartet for piano, violin, viola and cello (1999)
Vestiges of a Distant Time for orchestra (1996, revised 2003)
Soundings for clarinet, bassoon and piano (1994)
Variations for cello and chamber ensemble (1993)
Clarino for orchestra (1991, revised 1993, 1996)
Joyce Songs for mezzo-soprano, flute, clarinet and cello (1990, revised 1996)
Miniatures for clarinet (1989)
Piano Sonata (1988)
Metamorphosis for violin, cello, harp, 2 percussion, piano and celesta (1987)
Movement for string quartet (1985)

Reviews and discussions
 List of Reviews on a University of Oregon Webpage
 Comparison of George and David Crumb
 Review of the Cello Variations

References
Presser. https://web.archive.org/web/20070711120929/http://www.presser.com/Composers/info.cfm?Name=DAVIDCRUMB 
Inside Oregon. http://darkwing.uoregon.edu/newscenter/4.2.05-MusicToday.html 
University of Oregon. http://www.uoregon.edu/~drcrumb/honors.html

Notes

External links
David Crumb homepage on University of Oregon Website
Bio of Presser Online

1962 births
American male classical composers
American classical composers
21st-century classical composers
University of Oregon faculty
Living people
Eastman School of Music alumni
University of Pennsylvania alumni
Place of birth missing (living people)
Pupils of Samuel Adler (composer)
21st-century American composers
21st-century American male musicians